Winter House Cove was a fishing village on the eastern coast of Seal Bay, within the much larger Notre Dame Bay, Newfoundland, Canada.

According to tradition, George Marsh (born George Hood; 1825–1911), originally from near Wareham, Dorset, and his wife Louisa ( Loder) were the first permanent settlers and founded the community  1858–1860.

Winter House Cove had a population of 52 in 1966, down from a high of 74 in 1945. In the late 1960s, both it and nearby Lockesporte were resettled to Glovers Harbour, which survives to the present day.

See also
 List of ghost towns in Newfoundland and Labrador

References

Ghost towns in Newfoundland and Labrador
1960s disestablishments in Newfoundland and Labrador
Populated places disestablished in the 1960s